The Northern Region is a region of Malawi. It had a population of 2,289,780 in 2018, and covers an area of 26,931 km², making it the smallest region both by population and area. Its capital city is Mzuzu. Starting in the north and going clockwise, the Northern Region borders on Tanzania, Lake Malawi, Malawi's Central Region, and Zambia.

Geography
Of the 28 districts in Malawi, six are located within the Northern Region.

Chitipa
Karonga
Likoma
Mzimba
Nkhata Bay
Rumphi

In addition to mainland parts of Malawi, the Northern Region also includes the islands of Chizumulu and Likoma in Lake Malawi, which together make up Likoma District.

Communities

Major cities
Prominent townships and cities in the region include:

 Ekwendeni City (Mzimba District)
 Karonga City (Karonga District)
 Mzimba City (Mzimba District)
 Mzuzu City (which is also the capital city of Mzimba District and the region itself)
 Rumphi City (Rumphi District)
 Nkhata Bay City (Nkhata Bay District)

Towns
Mtawali
Maganga

Demographics
At the time of the 2018 Census of Malawi, the distribution of the population of the Northern Region by ethnic group was as follows:
 68.4% Tumbuka
 10.6% Tonga
 6.9% Nkhonde
 4.0% Chewa
 4.2% Lambya
 3.9% Ngoni
 2.7% Sukwa
 1.3% Lomwe
 1.1% Yao
 0.2% Sena
 0.1% Mang'anja
 5.1% Others

See also
Kanyika mine

References

 
Regions of Malawi